Rebecca is a 1938 Gothic novel written by English author Daphne du Maurier. The novel depicts an unnamed young woman who impetuously marries a wealthy widower, before discovering that both he and his household are haunted by the memory of his late first wife, the title character.

A bestseller which has never gone out of print, Rebecca sold 2.8 million copies between its publication in 1938 and 1965. It has been adapted numerous times for stage and screen, including a 1939 play by du Maurier herself, the film Rebecca (1940), directed by Alfred Hitchcock, which won the Academy Award for Best Picture, and the 2020 remake directed by Ben Wheatley for Netflix.

The novel is remembered especially for the character Mrs Danvers, the West Country estate Manderley, and its opening line: "Last night, I dreamt I went to Manderley again."

Plot
While working as the companion to a rich American woman on holiday in Monte Carlo, the unnamed narrator, a naïve young woman in her early 20s, becomes acquainted with a wealthy Englishman, Maxim de Winter, a 42-year-old widower. After a fortnight of courtship, she agrees to marry him and, after the wedding and honeymoon, accompanies him to his mansion in Cornwall, the beautiful estate Manderley.

Mrs Danvers, the sinister housekeeper, was profoundly devoted to the first Mrs de Winter, Rebecca, who died in a sailing accident about a year before Maxim and the second Mrs de Winter met. She continually attempts to undermine the narrator psychologically, subtly suggesting to her that she will never attain the beauty, urbanity, and charm her predecessor possessed. Whenever the narrator attempts to make changes at Manderley, Mrs Danvers describes how Rebecca ran it when she was alive. Cowed by Mrs Danvers' imposing manner and the other members of West Country society's unwavering reverence for Rebecca, the narrator becomes isolated.

The narrator is soon convinced that Maxim regrets his impetuous decision to marry her and is still deeply in love with the seemingly perfect Rebecca. In an attempt to please him, she revives the Manderley costume ball, a custom Rebecca had instated, with the help of Mrs Danvers. On her suggestion, the narrator wears a replica of the dress shown in a portrait of one of the house's former inhabitants, ignorant of the fact that Rebecca had worn the same costume to much acclaim shortly before her death. When the narrator enters the hall and Maxim sees the dress, he angrily orders her to change.

Shortly after the ball, Mrs Danvers reveals her contempt for the narrator, believing she is trying to replace Rebecca, and reveals her deep, unhealthy obsession with the dead woman. Mrs Danvers tries to get the narrator to commit suicide by encouraging her to jump out of the window. However, she is interrupted before the narrator does so by the disturbance caused by a nearby shipwreck. A diver investigating the wrecked ship's hull's condition also discovers the remains of Rebecca's sailing boat, with her decomposed body still on board, despite Maxim having identified another body that had washed ashore shortly after Rebecca's death.

This discovery causes Maxim to confess to the narrator that his marriage to Rebecca was a sham. Rebecca, Maxim reveals, was a cruel and selfish woman who manipulated everyone around her into believing her to be the perfect wife and a paragon of virtue. On the night of her death, she told Maxim that she was pregnant with another man's child, which she would raise under the pretense that it was Maxim's, and he would be powerless to stop her. In a rage Maxim shot and killed her. He then disposed of her body by placing it in her boat and sinking it at sea. The narrator is relieved to hear that Maxim has always loved her and never Rebecca.

Rebecca's boat is raised, and it is discovered to have been deliberately sunk. An inquest brings a verdict of suicide. However, Rebecca's first cousin and lover, Jack Favell, attempts to blackmail Maxim, claiming to have proof that she could not have intended suicide based on a note she sent to him the night she died. It is revealed that Rebecca had had an appointment with a doctor in London shortly before her death, presumably to confirm her pregnancy. When the doctor is found, he reveals that Rebecca had cancer and would have died within a few months. Furthermore, due to the malformation of her uterus, she could never have been pregnant. Maxim assumes that Rebecca, knowing that she would die, manipulated him into killing her quickly. Mrs Danvers had said after the inquiry that Rebecca feared nothing except dying a lingering death.

Maxim feels a great sense of foreboding and insists on driving through the night to return to Manderley. However, before he comes in sight of the house, it is clear from a glow on the horizon and wind-borne ashes that it is ablaze.

Characters

Principal characters
 The Narrator/the Second Mrs de Winter: A timid, naïve, middle-class woman in her early twenties, who enjoys sketching. Neither the narrator's first nor maiden name is revealed. She is referred to as "my wife", "Mrs de Winter", "my dear", and so on. The one time she is introduced with a name is during a fancy dress ball, in which she dresses as a de Winter ancestor and is introduced as "Caroline de Winter", although this is clearly not her own name. She signs her name as "Mrs M. de Winter", using Maxim's initial. Early in the novel she receives a letter and remarks that her name was correctly spelled, which is "an unusual thing," suggesting her name is uncommon, foreign or complex. While courting her, Maxim compliments her on her "lovely and unusual name". Despite her timidity, she gradually matures throughout the novel, refusing to be a victim of Rebecca's phantom-like influence any longer and becoming a strong, assertive woman in her own right.
 Maximilian "Maxim" de Winter: The reserved, unemotional owner of Manderley. He marries his new wife after a brief courtship, yet displays little affection toward her after the marriage. Emotionally scarred by his traumatic marriage to Rebecca, his distance toward his new wife causes her to fear he regrets his marriage to her and is still haunted by Rebecca's death. Maxim killed Rebecca after she told him that she was carrying her lover's child, that he would have to raise as his own. He does eventually reveal to his new wife that he never loved Rebecca, but not until several months of marriage have passed. In the 1940 film adaptation, his full name is George Fortescue Maximilian de Winter.
 Mrs Danvers: The cold, overbearing housekeeper of Manderley. Danvers was Rebecca's family maid when she was a child and has lived with her for years. She is unhealthily obsessed with Rebecca and preserving Rebecca's memory. She resents the new Mrs de Winter, convinced she is trying to "take Rebecca's place". She tries to undermine the new Mrs de Winter, but her efforts fail. After her scheme is ruined, Mrs Danvers apparently burns Manderley to the ground, preferring to destroy it than allow Maxim to share his home with another lover and wife. She is nicknamed Danny which is derived from her last name; her first name being unknown or unimportant, but in Sally Beauman's sequel Rebecca's Tale it was said to be Edith. 
 Rebecca de Winter: The unseen, deceased title character, who has been dead for less than a year. A famous beauty, and on the surface a devoted wife and perfect hostess, Rebecca was actually unfaithful to her husband Maxim. Her lingering presence overwhelms Manderley, dominating the visitors, the staff and the new Mrs de Winter. Through dialogue, it is slowly revealed that Rebecca possessed the signs of a psychopath: habitual lying, superficial charm, expert manipulation, no conscience and no remorse. She was also revealed to be somewhat sadistic—Danvers tells a story of Rebecca, during her teenage years, cruelly whipping a horse until it bled.

Minor characters
 Frank Crawley: The hard-working, dutiful agent of Manderley. He is said to be Maxim's trusted advisor and faithful confidant. He soon becomes a good friend to the second Mrs de Winter, and helps her in the self-doubt of her inability to rule Manderley as its mistress.
 Beatrice Lacy (formerly de Winter): Maxim's wilful and quick-witted sister, who develops an immediate fondness for the new Mrs de Winter. Prior to the novel, she had married Giles Lacy. She, along with her brother, is one of the few people who knew Rebecca's true, vile nature, and was one of her victims: Beatrice's husband was seduced by her.
 Giles Lacy: The slightly slow-witted husband of Beatrice, and Maxim's brother-in-law. He was one of the many men who fell for Rebecca's charms.
 Frith: The middle-aged, kind and devoted butler at Manderley. He already worked for the de Winters when Maxim was a boy.

 Robert: A footman.
 Mrs Van Hopper: The narrator's employer at the beginning of the novel, an obnoxious, overbearing American woman who relentlessly pursues wealthy and famous guests at the various hotels she stays at in order to latch on to their fame and boost her own status through association.
 Clarice: Mrs de Winter's faithful and trusted maid. She aided her lady and mistress in fitting her white, frilly gown for the fancy dress ball. She replaces the original maid, Alice, later on.
 Jack Favell: The crafty and sneaky first cousin of the late Rebecca de Winter and her most frequent lover. He and Rebecca grew up together, and he shares many of her worst traits, suggesting insanity runs in their family. He is strongly disliked by Maxim and several other characters. Since Rebecca's untimely demise, his one and only true friend and confidante is Mrs Danvers, whom he calls "Danny", just as Rebecca had done.
 Colonel Julyan: The investigator of the inquest into the true cause of Rebecca's untimely demise.
 Dr Baker: A doctor, who specializes in gynaecology. A few hours before her death, Rebecca went to see him in secret, when he diagnosed her with an unspecified type of cancer.

Locations
 The fictional Hôtel Côte d'Azur, Monte Carlo
 The fictional Manderley, a country estate which du Maurier's editor noted "is as much an atmosphere as a tangible erection of stones and mortar"
 a fictional hotel somewhere in the South, where the Maxim and his second wife temporarily live after Manderley was burnt

Development
In 1937, Daphne du Maurier signed a three-book deal with Victor Gollancz and accepted an advance of £1,000. A 2008 article in The Daily Telegraph indicates she had been toying with the theme of jealousy for the five years since her marriage in 1932. She started "sluggishly" and wrote a desperate apology to Gollancz: "The first 15,000 words I tore up in disgust and this literary miscarriage has cast me down rather."

Her husband, Tommy "Boy" Browning, was Lieutenant Colonel of the Grenadier Guards and they were posted to Alexandria, Egypt, with the Second Battalion, leaving Britain on 30 July 1937. Gollancz expected her manuscript on their return to Britain in December but she wrote that she was "ashamed to tell you that progress is slow on the new novel...There is little likelihood of my bringing back a finished manuscript in December."

On returning to Britain in December 1937, du Maurier decided to spend Christmas away from her family to write the book and she successfully delivered it to her publisher less than four months later. Du Maurier described the plot as "a sinister tale about a woman who marries a widower....Psychological and rather macabre."

Derivation and inspiration
Some commentators have noted parallels with Charlotte Brontë's Jane Eyre. Another of du Maurier's works, Jamaica Inn, is also linked to one of the Brontë sisters' works, Emily's Wuthering Heights. Du Maurier commented publicly in her lifetime that the book was based on her own memories of Menabilly and Cornwall, as well as her relationship with her father.

While du Maurier "categorised Rebecca as a study in jealousy ... she admitted its origins in her own life to few." Her husband had been "engaged before — to glamorous, dark-haired Jan Ricardo. The suspicion that Tommy remained attracted to Ricardo haunted Daphne." In The Rebecca Notebook of 1981, du Maurier "'remembered' Rebecca's gestation ... Seeds began to drop. A beautiful home ... a first wife ... jealousy, a wreck, perhaps at sea, near to the house ... But something terrible would have to happen, I did not know what..." She wrote in her notes prior to writing: 'I want to build up the character of the first [wife] in the mind of the second...until wife 2 is haunted day and night...a tragedy is looming very close and CRASH! BANG! something happens.'"

Du Maurier and her husband, "Tommy Browning, like Rebecca and Maximilian de Winter, were not faithful to one another." Subsequent to the novel's publication, "Jan Ricardo, tragically, died during the Second World War. She threw herself under a train."

Childhood visits to Milton Hall, Cambridgeshire (then in Northamptonshire) home of the Wentworth-Fitzwilliam family, may have influenced the descriptions of Manderley.

Literary technique
The famous opening line of the book "Last night I dreamt I went to Manderley again." is an iambic hexameter. The last line of the book "And the ashes blew towards us with the salt wind from the sea" is too in metrical form; almost but not quite an anapestic tetrameter.

Plagiarism allegations
Shortly after Rebecca was published in Brazil, critic Álvaro Lins pointed out many resemblances between du Maurier's book and the work of Brazilian writer Carolina Nabuco. Nabuco's A Sucessora (The Successor), published in 1934, has a main plot similar to Rebecca, for example a young woman marrying a widower and the strange presence of the first wife—plot features also shared with the far older Jane Eyre. Nina Auerbach alleged in her book Daphne du Maurier, Haunted Heiress, that du Maurier read the English version of the Brazilian book when the first drafts were sent to the same publisher as hers in order to be published in England, and based her famous best-seller on it.

Immediately following a 1941 article in The New York Times Book Review highlighting the two novels' many similarities, du Maurier issued a rebuttal in a letter to the editor. According to Nabuco's autobiography, Eight Decades, she (Nabuco) refused to sign an agreement brought to her by a United Artists' representative in which she would concede that the similarities between her book and the movie were mere coincidence. A further, ironic complication in Nabuco's allegations is the similarity between her novel and the novel Encarnação, written by José de Alencar, one of Brazil's most celebrated novelists of the nineteenth century, and published posthumously in 1893.

In 1944, according to The Hollywood Reporter, du Maurier; her U.S. publishers Doubleday; and United Artists, distributors of the film adaptation, were sued for plagiarism by Edwina Levin MacDonald who alleged that du Maurier had copied her 1927 novel Blind Windows, and sought an undisclosed amount of accounting and damages. The complaint was eventually dismissed on January 14, 1948.

Publishing history and reception
Du Maurier delivered the manuscript to her publisher, Victor Gollancz, in April 1938. On receipt, the book was read in Gollancz's office, and her "editor, Norman Collins, reported simply: 'The new Daphne du Maurier contains everything that the public could want.'" Gollancz's "reaction to Rebecca was relief and jubilation" and "a 'rollicking success' was predicted by him." He "did not hang around" and "ordered a first print run of 20,000 copies and within a month Rebecca had sold more than twice that number." The novel has been continuously in print since 1938 and in 1993 "du Maurier's US publishers Avon estimated ongoing monthly paperback sales of Rebecca at more than 4,000 copies."

Promotion
Du Maurier "did several radio interviews with BBC and other stations" and "attended Foyle's Literary Lunch" in August 1938 while Good Housekeeping, Ladies Home Journal, and House & Garden published articles on du Maurier.

Reception in the professional and popular press
The Times stated that "the material is of the humblest ... nothing in this is beyond the novelette." In the Christian Science Monitor of 14 September 1938, V.S. Pritchett predicted the novel "would be here today, gone tomorrow."

More recently, in a column for The Independent, the critics Ceri Radford and Chris Harvey recommended the book and argued that Rebecca is a "marvellously gothic tale" with a good dose of atmospheric and psychological horror.

Few critics saw in the novel what the author wanted them to see: the exploration of the relationship between a man who is powerful and a woman who is not.

Print history
Rebecca is listed in the 20th-Century American Bestsellers descriptive bibliography database maintained by the University of Illinois. The entry, by Katherine Huber, provided the detailed information on the English and American editions as well as translations listed below.

English editions

Translations

Critical reception
On 5 November 2019, the BBC News listed Rebecca on its list of the 100 most inspiring novels.

Awards
In the U.S., du Maurier won the National Book Award for favourite novel of 1938, voted by members of the American Booksellers Association. In 2003, the novel was listed at number 14 on the UK survey The Big Read.

In 2017, it was voted the UK's favourite book of the past 225 years in a poll by bookseller W H Smith. Other novels in the shortlist were To Kill a Mockingbird by Harper Lee, Pride and Prejudice by Jane Austen, Jane Eyre by Charlotte Brontë, and 1984 by George Orwell.

Adaptations

Film
The best known of the theatrical film adaptations is the Academy Award–winning 1940 Alfred Hitchcock film version Rebecca, the first film Hitchcock made under his contract with David O. Selznick. The film, which starred Laurence Olivier as Maxim, Joan Fontaine as his wife, and Dame Judith Anderson as Mrs Danvers, was based on the novel. However, the Hollywood Production Code required that if Maxim had murdered his wife, he would have to be punished for his crime. Therefore, the key turning point of the novel—the revelation that Maxim, in fact, murdered Rebecca—was altered so that Rebecca's death was accidental. This change had not been made in Orson Welles' previous radio play which included a promotion of the film. At the end of the film version, Mrs Danvers perishes in the fire, which she had started. The film quickly became a classic, and at the time, was a major technical achievement in film-making.

In 2020, there was a Netflix adaptation, directed by Ben Wheatley and written by Jane Goldman, starring Lily James as the second Mrs de Winter, Armie Hammer as Maxim, and Kristin Scott Thomas as Mrs Danvers.

Television

Rebecca was adapted for The Philco Television Playhouse (10 October 1948), with Mary Anderson and Bramwell Fletcher; Robert Montgomery Presents (22 May 1950), with Barbara Bel Geddes and Peter Cookson; and Broadway Television Theatre (1 September 1952), with Patricia Breslin and Scott Forbes.

Theatre '62 presented an NBC-TV adaptation starring James Mason as Maxim, Joan Hackett as the second Mrs de Winter, and Nina Foch as Mrs Danvers.

Rebecca, a 1979 BBC adaptation, was directed by Simon Langton and starred Jeremy Brett as Maxim, Joanna David as the second Mrs de Winter, and Anna Massey (Jeremy Brett's former wife) as Mrs Danvers. It ran for four 55-minute episodes. It was broadcast in the United States on PBS as part of its Mystery! series.

Rebecca, a 1997 Carlton Television drama serial, starred Emilia Fox (Joanna David's daughter, in the same role played by her mother in 1979), Charles Dance as de Winter, and Dame Diana Rigg as Mrs Danvers. It was directed by Jim O'Brien, with a screenplay by Arthur Hopcraft. It was broadcast in the United States by PBS as part of Masterpiece Theatre. This adaptation is noteworthy for featuring an appearance by Rebecca, played by Lucy Cohu. It also shows Maxim saving Mrs Danvers from the fire, ending with an epilogue showing Maxim and the second Mrs de Winter relaxing abroad, as she explains what she and Maxim do with their days now they are unlikely ever to return to Manderley.

In 2008, a two-part Italian TV adaption, loosely based on the novel and named Rebecca, la prima moglie, aired on the national public broadcaster RAI. The episodes feature Alessio Boni as Maxim de Winter, Cristiana Capotondi as Jennifer de Winter and Mariangela Melato as Mrs Danvers. The mini-series was filmed in Trieste. 

Noor Pur Ki Rani, an Urdu language Pakistani drama television series adaptation directed by Haissam Hussain and dramatized by Pakistani writer and author Samira Fazal, was broadcast on Hum TV in 2009. The main role was played by Sanam Baloch.

Radio
The first adaptation of Rebecca for any medium was presented 9 December 1938, by Orson Welles, as the debut program of his live CBS Radio series The Campbell Playhouse (the sponsored continuation of The Mercury Theatre on the Air). Introducing the story, Welles refers to the forthcoming motion picture adaptation by David O. Selznick; at the conclusion of the show he interviews Daphne du Maurier in London via shortwave radio. The novel was adapted by Howard E. Koch. Welles and Margaret Sullavan starred as Max de Winter and the second Mrs de Winter. Other cast included Mildred Natwick (Mrs Danvers), Ray Collins (Frank Crawley), George Coulouris (Captain Searle), Frank Readick (as Ben), Alfred Shirley (Frith), Eustace Wyatt (Coroner) and Agnes Moorehead (Mrs Van Hopper). Bernard Herrmann composed and conducted the score, which later formed the basis of his score for the 1943 film Jane Eyre.

The Screen Guild Theater presented half-hour adaptions with Joan Fontaine, her husband at the time Brian Aherne, and Agnes Moorehead (31 May 1943), and with Loretta Young, John Lund and Agnes Moorehead (18 November 1948). Joan Fontaine and Joseph Cotten performed a half-hour adaptation 1 October 1946 on The Cresta Blanca Hollywood Players.

The Lux Radio Theatre presented hour-long adaptations with Ronald Colman, Ida Lupino and Judith Anderson (3 February 1941), and with Laurence Olivier, Vivien Leigh and Betty Blythe (6 November 1950). These were tie-ins to the Hitchcock film, and perpetuated the censorship of the novel which the Hays Office had imposed on that film, although Orson Welles' radio version which predated the film (and including a promotion for the film) was faithful to the original, asserting that Max de Winter had deliberately murdered Rebecca.

Theatre
Du Maurier herself adapted Rebecca as a stage play in 1939; it had a successful London run in 1940 of over 350 performances. The Talking Books for the blind edition read by Barbara Caruso borrows heavily from this stage adaptation which differs materially from the novel in many respects including changing the iconic ending of the novel.

A Broadway stage adaptation starring Diana Barrymore, Bramwell Fletcher and Florence Reed ran 18 January – 3 February 1945, at the Ethel Barrymore Theatre.

The book has also been adapted into a German-language musical, Rebecca, which opened in Vienna in 2006 and ran for three years.

Opera
Rebecca was adapted as an opera with music by Wilfred Josephs, premiered by Opera North in Leeds, England, 15 October 1983.

Sequels and related works
The novel has inspired three additional books approved by the du Maurier estate:
 Mrs de Winter (1993) by Susan Hill.
 The Other Rebecca (1996) by Maureen Freely.
 Rebecca's Tale (2001) by Sally Beauman
In addition, a number of fan fiction websites feature sequels, prequels, and adaptations of this novel.

As a code key in World War II
One edition of the book was used by the Germans in World War II as the key to a book code. Sentences would be made using single words in the book, referred to by page number, line and position in the line. One copy was kept at Rommel's headquarters, and the other was carried by German Abwehr agents infiltrated into Cairo after crossing Egypt by car, guided by Count László Almásy. This code never was used, however, because the radio section of the headquarters was captured in a skirmish and hence the Germans suspected that the code was compromised.

This use of the book is referred to in Ken Follett's novel The Key to Rebecca—where a (fictional) spy does use it to pass critical information to Rommel. This use was also referenced in Michael Ondaatje's 1992 novel The English Patient.

Notable cultural references

Literature
The character of Mrs Danvers is alluded to numerous times throughout Stephen King's Bag of Bones. In the book, Mrs Danvers serves as something of a bogeyman for the main character Mike Noonan.

In Jasper Fforde's Thursday Next series, thousands of Mrs Danvers clones are created.

Television

The 1970 Parallel Time storyline of the Gothic soap opera Dark Shadows was heavily inspired by Rebecca including the costume ball scene. The second Dark Shadows motion picture Night of Dark Shadows also took inspiration from the novel.

The film was parodied on The Carol Burnett Show in a 1972 skit called "Rebecky", with Carol Burnett as the heroine, Daphne; Harvey Korman as Max "de Wintry" and in the guise of Mother Marcus as Rebecky de Wintry; and Vicki Lawrence as Mrs Dampers.

Another parody of the story is found in the second series of the sketch show That Mitchell and Webb Look from 2008. The sketch, which stars Robert Webb as Maxim, David Mitchell as Mrs Danvers, and Jo Neary as Rebecca, explores an alternate approach to a filmatization of the novel. Here, the story is narrated by Rebecca, who is haunted by the household’s anticipation of a second Mrs De Winter. 

The plots of some Latin-American soap operas have also been inspired by the novel, such as Manuela (Argentina), Infierno en el paraíso (Mexico), the Venezuelan telenovela Julia and its remake El Fantasma de Elena on Telemundo, and "La Sombra de Belinda" a telenovela from Puerto Rico.

Music
Meg & Dia's Meg Frampton penned a song titled "Rebecca", inspired by the novel.

Kansas alumnus Steve Walsh's solo recording Glossolalia includes a song titled "Rebecca" with the lyrics: "I suppose I was the lucky one, returning like a wayward son to Manderley, I'd never be the same..."

Steve Hackett included a song titled "Rebecca" on his album To Watch the Storms.

Taylor Swift's song "Tolerate It", featured on her album Evermore, is inspired by the novel.

Fashion
In 2013, Devon watchmakers Du Maurier Watches, founded by the grandson of Daphne du Maurier, released a limited edition collection of two watches inspired by the characters from the novel—The Rebecca and The Maxim.

References

External links
 Rebecca at the British Library
 .
 
 "Rebecca" (9 December 1938) on The Campbell Playhouse, with Orson Welles and Margaret Sullavan (Indiana University Bloomington)

 
1938 British novels
Anthony Award-winning works
British crime novels
British Gothic novels
British novels adapted into films
British romance novels
National Book Award for Fiction winning works
Novels by Daphne du Maurier
Novels involved in plagiarism controversies
Novels set in England
Novels set in Monaco
Victor Gollancz Ltd books
Works about remarriage
Works about widowhood